La Mer was a thoroughbred racehorse, who raced from 1976 to 1979. 

La Mer was sired by Copenhagen II from La Balsa (New Zealand). She was bred by Jack Alexander at Cranleigh Stud in Wanganui and born on Melbourne Cup day in 1973. Later she was sold to Mr L (Allen) Alexander of Wynthorpe Stud, Lepperton. 

She was trained by Malcolm Smith at Bell Block, New Plymouth.

She raced and won 24 times out of 43 starts, as well as second 5 times and third 6 times in 1200m to 2400m, winning NZ$225,925 and AUS$19,500 in stake money.

La Mer was the 1979 Horse of the Year and 1977 Filly of the Year in New Zealand.

Racing career
La Mer won numerous Weight for Age races in New Zealand.  She also won the Coongy Handicap and placed second in the Mackinnon Stakes in Australia.

The following are some of the major races she raced in.

Progeny

After finishing her racing, La Mer was purchased by Irish owner Captain Tim Rogers and exported to Ireland for her breeding career.

La Mer's first foal, Loughmore (Ire), by Artaius, winner of the Sandown Eclipse Stakes, was brought to New Zealand where she won once from ten starts and produced the Group One Manawatu Sires Produce Stakes winner Little Jamie.

La Mer left seven winners, although none had the quality of herself.

See also

 Thoroughbred racing in New Zealand

References

 New Zealand Thoroughbred Racing Annual 1979 (8th edition).Costello, John, Editor. Moa Publications, Auckland, New Zealand.
 New Zealand Thoroughbred Racing Annual 1978 (7th edition).Costello, John, Editor. Moa Publications, Auckland, New Zealand.
 The Great Decade of New Zealand racing 1970-1980. Glengarry, Jack. William Collins Publishers Ltd, Wellington, New Zealand.
1973 racehorse births
Racehorses bred in New Zealand
Racehorses trained in New Zealand
Thoroughbred family 6-d